The Lady is Willing is a 1942 Columbia Pictures screwball comedy film starring Marlene Dietrich and Fred MacMurray, directed by Mitchell Leisen.

Plot

Elizabeth Madden (Marlene Dietrich) longs for motherhood but has no husband. Her desire appears to be fulfilled when she finds an abandoned baby, but she doesn't have a clue on how to raise it. She finds divorced pediatrician, Dr. Corey McBain (Fred MacMurray), to help her with the child.

Cast

 Marlene Dietrich as Elizabeth 'Liza' Madden
 Fred MacMurray as Dr. Corey T. McBain
 Aline MacMahon as Buddy
 Stanley Ridges as Kenneth Hanline
 Arline Judge as Frances
 Roger Clark as Victor
 Marietta Canty as Mary Lou
 David James as Baby Corey
 Ruth Ford as Myrtle Glossamer
 Harvey Stephens as Dr. Golding
 Harry Shannon as Detective Sergeant Barnes
 Elisabeth Risdon as Mrs. Cummings
 Charles Lane as K.K. Miller
 Murray Alper as Joe Quig
 Kitty Kelly as Nellie Quig
 Ray Walker as Reporter

References

External links 
 
 
 
 

1942 films
1940s romantic comedy-drama films
1940s screwball comedy films
American romantic comedy-drama films
American screwball comedy films
American black-and-white films
Columbia Pictures films
Films about actors
Films directed by Mitchell Leisen
Films set in New York City
1942 comedy films
1940s English-language films
1940s American films